Campoplegini is a tribe of parasitic wasps in the subfamily Campopleginae.

References

External links 
 
 

Campopleginae
Parasitica tribes